The Tsingshan Holdings Group is a Chinese private company active in the stainless steel and nickel industry.

Tsingshan Holdings was founded in 1988 by Xiang Guangda in Wenzhou. It moved into the Indonesian nickel industry in 2009.

Among its assets are:
Bases for nickel-chromium alloy smelting, stainless steel smelting and steel rolling in Lishui, Fuyang, Yangjiang and Qingyuan
A share in the Morowali Industrial Park - a nickel processing facility with at least 20 smelters in Morowali Regency, Sulawesi, part of the Belt and Road Initiative
Chrome ore mines in Zimbabwe
Sales outlets in Foshan, Wenzhou, Shanghai and Wuxi

Tsingshan was ranked 279th in the Fortune Global 500 for 2021. It has been described as the world's largest nickel producer.

In early 2022, Tsingshan experienced financial difficulty after shorting the price of nickel, only to see it rise. The firm took losses of about USD 1 billion, and later disbanded its internal futures trading team.

References

External links
 

Chinese companies established in 1988
Companies based in Zhejiang
Holding companies of China
Steel companies of China
Nickel mining companies